Yiftach Klein (born 28 September 1972) is an Israeli actor. He has been nominated for two Ophir Awards for Best Supporting Actor in 2007 for Noodle and for Best Actor in 2011 for his role in Policeman.

Personal life
Klein is married to Shiri Artzi, the daughter of Shlomo Artzi.

Filmography

References

External links 
 

1972 births
Living people
Israeli male film actors
Israeli male television actors
Jewish Israeli male actors
Male actors from Tel Aviv
21st-century Israeli male actors